Anna Beneck (23 June 1942 – 3 September 2013) was an Italian butterfly swimmer. She competed at the 1960 Olympics in the 100 m butterfly and 4×100 m medley relay, but was eliminated in the preliminaries. Beneck was married to Salvatore Morale, who ran 400 m hurdles at the 1960 Olympics. Her sister Daniela was her teammate in the 1960 swimming team, she married Roberto Frinolli, also an Olympic 400 m hurdler.

References

1942 births
2013 deaths
Swimmers at the 1960 Summer Olympics
Italian female butterfly swimmers
Olympic swimmers of Italy